Takenori Ito  is a Japanese mixed martial artist.

Mixed martial arts record

|-
| Win
| align=center| 6-3-2
| Kazuya Abe
| Decision (majority)
| Shooto - Renaxis 3
| 
| align=center| 2
| align=center| 5:00
| Setagaya, Japan
| 
|-
| Draw
| align=center| 5-3-2
| Masato Fujiwara
| Draw
| Shooto - Las Grandes Viajes 6
| 
| align=center| 3
| align=center| 5:00
| Tokyo, Japan
| 
|-
| Draw
| align=center| 5-3-1
| Kazumichi Takada
| Draw
| Shooto - Las Grandes Viajes 5
| 
| align=center| 2
| align=center| 5:00
| Tokyo, Japan
| 
|-
| Loss
| align=center| 5-3
| Takuya Kuwabara
| Decision (majority)
| Shooto - Gig '98 1st
| 
| align=center| 3
| align=center| 5:00
| Tokyo, Japan
| 
|-
| Win
| align=center| 5-2
| Hiroki Kotani
| Decision (unanimous)
| Shooto - Las Grandes Viajes 2
| 
| align=center| 2
| align=center| 5:00
| Tokyo, Japan
| 
|-
| Win
| align=center| 4-2
| Naoto Kojima
| Decision (majority)
| Shooto - Reconquista 4
| 
| align=center| 2
| align=center| 5:00
| Tokyo, Japan
| 
|-
| Loss
| align=center| 3-2
| Kyuhei Ueno
| Submission (armbar)
| Shooto - Shooto
| 
| align=center| 1
| align=center| 2:35
| Tokyo, Japan
| 
|-
| Win
| align=center| 3-1
| Masato Suzuki
| Decision (unanimous)
| Shooto - Shooto
| 
| align=center| 3
| align=center| 3:00
| Tokyo, Japan
| 
|-
| Win
| align=center| 2-1
| Norito Ogasawara
| Submission (armbar)
| Shooto - Shooto
| 
| align=center| 1
| align=center| 1:53
| Tokyo, Japan
| 
|-
| Loss
| align=center| 1-1
| Masato Suzuki
| Decision (unanimous)
| Shooto - Shooto
| 
| align=center| 3
| align=center| 3:00
| Tokyo, Japan
| 
|-
| Win
| align=center| 1-0
| Yoshihiko Abe
| Submission (armbar)
| Shooto - Shooto
| 
| align=center| 1
| align=center| 0:00
| Tokyo, Japan
|

See also
List of male mixed martial artists

References

External links
 
 Takenori Ito at mixedmartialarts.com
 Takenori Ito at fightmatrix.com

Japanese male mixed martial artists
Living people
Year of birth missing (living people)